Indium arsenide antimonide phosphide is a semiconductor material.

InAsSbP has been used as blocking layers for semiconductor laser structures, as well as for the mid-infrared light-emitting diodes and lasers, photodetectors and thermophotovoltaic cells.

InAsSbP layers can be grown by heteroepitaxy on indium arsenide, gallium antimonide and other materials.

See also
 Aluminium gallium indium phosphide
 Gallium indium arsenide antimonide phosphide

References

III-V semiconductors
Indium compounds
Arsenides
Antimonides
Phosphides
III-V compounds